The Diocese of Garissa may refer to;

Anglican Diocese of Garissa, in the city of Garissa, Kenya
Roman Catholic Diocese of Garissa, in the city of Garissa, Kenya